The name Adrian has been used for seven tropical cyclones in the Eastern Pacific Ocean.
 Tropical Storm Adrian (1981), remained off the coast of Mexico
 Tropical Storm Adrian (1987), looped off the coast of Mexico
 Hurricane Adrian (1993), remained well out to sea
 Hurricane Adrian (1999), remained off the coast of Mexico
 Hurricane Adrian (2005), became a Category 1 hurricane before making landfall in Central America
 Hurricane Adrian (2011), became a strong Category 4 hurricane and passed to the south of the coast of Mexico
Tropical Storm Adrian (2017), formed southeast of the Gulf of Tehuantepec and remained offshore

Pacific hurricane set index articles